Lizzy Seeberg was a 19 year old freshman at St. Mary's College when she committed suicide, after accusing a Notre Dame football player named Prince Shembo of sexual assault. After she filed a complaint with the police she received several frightening texts from a friend of the accused like "Don't do anything you would regret, messing with Notre Dame football is a bad idea." She died by suicide that September, 10 days after making the complaint to the campus police. 13 members of the Seeberg family have attended either Notre Dame or St. Mary's.

Prosecutors did not file criminal charges due to Lizzy not being alive to testify and also because of what they described as inconsistencies in witness accounts and cellphone records. The school determined that Lizzy lied because she said the player stopped attacking her after receiving a call or a text, but phone records showed that it was the accused who called his friend. An expert from the police department told The Washington Post that victims often get some details mixed up because of the way the brain processes information in traumatic situations.

Prince Shembo
During the 2014 NFL Scouting Combine, Prince Shembo admitted that as a Notre Dame student in 2010, he was accused of sexual battery against Seeberg and said that he is innocent of the accusation. Seeberg's father responded that Notre Dame was negligent in investigating Seeberg's accusation because they were protecting Shembo.

Complaint and investigation
In her statement to the police Lizzy told them  "I didn't feel safe in his room....he proceeded to grab my face and started to kiss me. Tears started rolling down my face because I didn't know what to do...I felt so scared, I couldn't move."

At that time of her death investigators still had not interviewed the accused, which they did 15 days after she made the complaint. In response to the families complaints about Notre Dame's investigation the university issued a statement saying "we have great sympathy for a grieving family that may believe our investigation was insufficient, but we also respectfully and wholeheartedly disagree with that contention."

However, the university had investigated Lizzy herself, including speaking with a former roommate at another school that she had previously had some disagreement with.

Media
At a closed door hearing held after the story made headlines in the national media the accused football player was found "not responsible" and was not suspended from the team. Seeberg's death or accusations were not publicly known until the story was broken by the Chicago Tribune.

See also
Vanderbilt rape case

References 

Saint Mary's College (Indiana)
Suicides in Indiana
Campus sexual assault
2010 suicides
History of women in Indiana
Sexual assault in sports